William Edwin Baldwin (July 28, 1827 – February 19, 1864) was a Confederate Army officer during the American Civil War. 
 
A bookstore owner and member of the local militia in Columbus, Mississippi, Baldwin enlisted in the Confederate Army soon after Mississippi announced its secession from the Union, accepting a commission as Colonel of the 14th Mississippi Infantry Regiment. Stationed briefly in Pensacola, Florida, he was transferred with his unit to East Tennessee and later central Kentucky, where he fought and was later captured at the Battle of Fort Donelson. 

After being released in a prisoner exchange, he was promoted to the rank of brigadier general and sent to West Tennessee, where he assumed command of a mixed brigade of Mississippi and Tennessee soldiers. Winning distinction at the Battle of Coffeeville, Baldwin would later participate in the battles of Port Gibson and Champion's Hill during the Vicksburg Campaign. Baldwin was captured when Vicksburg fell.  After being exchanged he was assigned to the District of Mobile.   There he was killed in an accident when a broken stirrup caused him to fall off his horse, near the Dog River in Alabama.

See also

List of American Civil War generals (Confederate)

References
 Eicher, John H., and David J. Eicher, Civil War High Commands. Stanford: Stanford University Press, 2001. .
 Sifakis, Stewart. Who Was Who in the Civil War. New York: Facts On File, 1988. .
 Warner, Ezra J. Generals in Gray: Lives of the Confederate Commanders. Baton Rouge: Louisiana State University Press, 1959. .

1827 births
1864 deaths
Confederate States Army brigadier generals
People of Mississippi in the American Civil War
American Civil War prisoners of war
People from Columbus, Mississippi
Accidental deaths in Alabama
Deaths by horse-riding accident in the United States